The women's marathon at the 2022 World Athletics Championships was held at the Hayward Field in Eugene on 18 July 2022.

Records
Before the competition records were as follows:

Qualification standard
The standard to qualify automatically for entry was 2:29:30.

Schedule
The event schedule, in local time (UTC−7), was as follows:

Results 
The final was started on 18 July at 06:15.

References

Marathon
Marathons at the World Athletics Championships